Broughton Cross railway station was situated on the Cockermouth and Workington Railway and served the village of Broughton Cross, Cumbria, England.

History
The station opened on 28 April 1847 and closed on 2 March 1942.

Afterlife
By 2013 the station site was buried under the A66.

See also

 Cockermouth, Keswick and Penrith Railway

References

Sources

Further reading

External links
Map of the line with photos, via RAILSCOT
The station on an OS map surveyed in 1864, via National Library of Scotland
The station on overlain OS maps surveyed from 1898, via National Library of Scotland
The closed station on a 1948 OS Map, via npe maps
The station, via Rail Map Online
The railways of Cumbria, via Cumbrian Railways Association
Photos of Cumbrian railways, via Cumbrian Railways Association
The railways of Cumbria, via Railways_of_Cumbria
Cumbrian Industrial History, via Cumbria Industrial History Society
Local history of the CKPR route, via Cockermouth
The line's and station's Engineer's Line References, via railwaycodes.org.uk
A video tour-de-force of the region's closed lines, via cumbriafilmarchive

Disused railway stations in Cumbria
Former London and North Western Railway stations
Railway stations in Great Britain opened in 1847
Railway stations in Great Britain closed in 1942
1847 establishments in England